Harrison Township is one of nine townships in Wells County, Indiana, United States. As of the 2010 census, its population was 8,531 and it contained 3,702 housing units.

History
Six Mile Church, the first organized church in Wells County was formed in Harrison Township by Hallet Barber on September 2, 1838.

The Bethel Methodist Episcopal Church was listed on the National Register of Historic Places in 1984.

Geography

Cities, towns, villages
 Bluffton (the county seat) (south half)
 Poneto (east quarter)
 Vera Cruz

Unincorporated towns
 Reiffsburg at 
 Riverside at 
 Travisville at 
(This list is based on USGS data and may include former settlements.)

Adjacent townships
 Lancaster Township (north)
 Kirkland Township, Adams County (northeast)
 French Township, Adams County (east)
 Hartford Township, Adams County (southeast)
 Nottingham Township (south)
 Chester Township (southwest)
 Liberty Township (west)
 Rockcreek Township (northwest)

Cemeteries
The township contains four cemeteries: Elm Grove, Grove, Linn and Saint Johns. The County Poor Farm Cemetery no longer exists, although burial records are available.

Rivers
 Wabash River

Lakes
 Kunkel Lake

School districts
 Metropolitan School District of Bluffton-Harrison

Political districts
 Indiana's 6th congressional district
 State House District 82
 State Senate District 19

References
 United States Census Bureau 2007 TIGER/Line Shapefiles
 United States Board on Geographic Names (GNIS)
 IndianaMap

External links
 Indiana Township Association
 United Township Association of Indiana

Townships in Wells County, Indiana
Fort Wayne, IN Metropolitan Statistical Area
Townships in Indiana